Lisa Vitting (born 9 July 1991) is a German swimmer.

Vitting was born in Moers, Germany.

She competed at the 2012 Summer Olympics in the 4 × 100 m freestyle relay and finished in ninth place. 

She won two European titles in this event in 2010 and 2012 and a bronze medal at the world championships in Shanghai in 2011.

References

External links

 

Living people
1991 births
People from Moers
Sportspeople from Düsseldorf (region)
German female freestyle swimmers
German female swimmers
World Aquatics Championships medalists in swimming
Olympic swimmers of Germany
Swimmers at the 2012 Summer Olympics
European Aquatics Championships medalists in swimming
21st-century German women
20th-century German women